The Embassy of Ukraine in Ireland is the diplomatic mission of Ukraine in Ireland. It is located in the capital of Ireland, Dublin.

History 
Ireland recognized Ukraine on 31 December 1991. Diplomatic relations were established shortly after on 1 April 1992.

Ukraine opened its embassy in Ireland in August 2003.

Gallery

See also 

 Foreign relations of Ireland
 List of diplomatic missions in Ireland

References 

Ireland–Ukraine relations
Ukraine
Dublin
2003 establishments in Ireland